Improper input validation or unchecked user input is a type of vulnerability in computer software that may be used for security exploits. This vulnerability is caused when "[t]he product does not validate or incorrectly validates input that can affect the control flow or data flow of a program."

Examples include:
 Buffer overflow
 Cross-site scripting
 Directory traversal
 Null byte injection
 SQL injection
 Uncontrolled format string

References 

Computer security exploits